Laksamana Upin & Ipin is a cancelled and unfinished second animated film from the series of Upin & Ipin, a Malaysian 3D animated series. It was being produced by Les' Copaque Production. This film was cancelled due to unexpected financial and schedule situation which occurred in 2011. Eventually, it was repurposed as a regular episode.

See also
 List of abandoned and unfinished films

Malaysian animated films
Les' Copaque Production films
Grand Brilliance films
Unfinished animated films